Edmonson County High School is a four year high school located in 
Brownsville, Kentucky, United States. It is the only high school serving 
the Edmonson County School system.

History
The school was established in 1959 following the consolidation of all the rural high schools throughout Edmonson County. The original location was at 191 West Center Street, which was home of the Edmonson County Middle School from 1981 until summer 2004, and is now the current location of the Edmonson County Fifth/Sixth Grade Center since 2004. The current Edmonson County High School was completed in 1981.

In the early 2000s, the decision was made to expand the high school facility and to construct a new Middle School next to the high school. That project was completed in time for the start of the 2004–2005 academic year.

Volunteers have digitized and created a repository of video related to Edmonson County High School on YouTube. The archive contains a variety of media, including graduation ceremonies, proms, and athletic events.

Academics
The school's academic team is one of the most competitive in the state, earning district, regional and state honors in Kentucky Governors' Cup competition. They won three straight state All A Classic titles from 1996 to 1998. In 1990, they were Beta Quizbowl national runners up. Edmonson County has sent 3 students in its history to Gatton Academy.
Edmonson County High School, according to the U.S. News & World Report rankings, ranks #170 out of the 380 high schools in Kentucky, with a 7.6 rate in college readiness. On their national rankings list, ECHS ranks #11,862.

Band
The marching band competes around the state at KMEA and MSBA sanctioned competitions (the Marching Band is classified as 1A West) each year starting from August and ending in October. The band is one of the smallest in Kentucky averaging around 25 members. The band performs at football games for Half-Time entertainment. The band also plays at Basketball games and or any district/state tournaments. The band has gone to KMEA State 2007, 2008, 2009, 2010, 2011, 2012, 2013, 2018, and 2019.

Athletics
The Edmonson County High School athletic teams are known as the Wildcats. The school colors are navy blue, red, and white.

The football team competes in the KHSAA at the Class 2A level. The school's main rivalry is with the Grayson County Cougars. The two teams play in the Tobacco Bowl each year, with the winner getting to keep a 
ceremonial tobacco stick as a trophy. The stick is usually painted in the winning team's school colors.

The boys and girls basketball teams compete in a district that includes Whitesville Trinity, Grayson County, and Butler County High School basketball teams.

The boys basketball team won the KHSAA State Championship, also known as the Sweet Sixteen, in 1976.

Notable alumni
 Joe Blanton, Major League Baseball pitcher

References

External links

Edmonson County Schools

Educational institutions established in 1959
Public high schools in Kentucky
Schools in Edmonson County, Kentucky
1959 establishments in Kentucky